Covered in Gas is the debut album by Evil Cowards. It was released in 2009. A music video for "Love Pigs" was released on YouTube via Fall On Your Sword's official account.

Track listing 
 "Love Pigs" - 3:36
 "Sex Wars" - 3:17
 "Theme From Evil Cowards" - 2:53
 "500 Ways" - 4:36
 "Soldiers of Satan" - 3:54
 "My Mind is Rotting" - 2:30
 "Classon Ave. Robots" - 2:34
 "I'm Not Scared of Flying Saucers" - 4:02
 "Horrible People" - 3:18
 "You Really Like Me" - 3:43
 "Please Don't Make Me Feel You Again" - 3:15
 "Zora And Nora" - 3:53
 "Chopping Up The Teacher" - 2:32

Tyler Spencer provides the main vocals on all tracks except "Chopping Up the Teacher", which is performed by William Bates.

Legacy
 Dick Valentine recorded an acoustic version of "Sex Wars" for his solo album "Quiet Time".
 Demos of the songs "Classon Ave. Robots", "I'm Not Scared of Flying Saucers" and "Zora and Nora" were subsequently released on "The Dick Valentine Raw Collection".

References

2009 debut albums
Evil Cowards albums
Metropolis Records albums